Lithic fragments, or lithics, are pieces of other rocks that have been eroded down to sand size and now are sand grains in a sedimentary rock.  They were first described and named (in their modern definitions) by Bill Dickinson in 1970.  Lithic fragments can be derived from sedimentary, igneous or metamorphic rocks.  A lithic fragment is defined using the Gazzi-Dickinson point-counting method and being in the sand-size fraction.  Sand grains in sedimentary rocks that are fragments of larger rocks that are not identified using the Gazzi-Dickinson method are usually called rock fragments instead of lithic fragments.  Sandstones rich in lithic fragments are called lithic sandstones.Lithic fragments can also be define as the breakdown of preexisting ,fine -to medium grained igneous . metamorphic and sedimentary rocks results in sand -sized fragments..

Types

Igneous (Lv)
These can include granular (~rhyolitic), microlitic (~andesitic), lathwork (~basaltic), and vitric (glassy).  These correlations between composition and volcanic lithic fragment type are approximate, at best. By definition, intrusive igneous rock fragments can not be considered lithic fragments.

Sedimentary (Ls)
These can include shale siltstone fragments, and (at times) chert.

Metamorphic (Lm)
These can include fine-grained schist and phyllite fragments, among others.

References

Petrology